Govind Ballabh Pant (10 September 1887 – 7 March 1961) was an Indian freedom fighter and the first chief minister of Uttar Pradesh. Alongside Mahatma Gandhi, Jawaharlal Nehru and Vallabh Bhai Patel, Pant was a key figure in the movement for India's Independence and later a pivotal figure in the Indian Government. He was one of the foremost political leaders of Uttar Pradesh (then known as United Provinces) and a key player in the unsuccessful movement to establish Hindi as the official language of Indian Union.

Today, several Indian hospitals, educational institutions and foundations bear his name. Pant received India's highest civilian honour, the Bharat Ratna, in 1957.

Early life
Govind Ballabh Pant was born on 10 September 1887 in khut village  near Almora. He was born in a Marathi Karhade Brahmin family that had migrated from the present day northern Karnataka to Kumaon region. 
The name of his mother was Govindi Bai. His maternal grandfather, Badri Dutt Joshi, an important local government official who played a significant role in shaping his personality and political views, raised Govind because his father, Manorath Pant, was a government official who was constantly on the move.

Pant studied at Allahabad University and subsequently worked as a lawyer in Kashipur. Here, he began active work against the British Raj in 1914, when he helped a local parishad, or village council, in their successful challenge of coolie begar, a law requiring locals to provide free transportation of the luggage of travelling British officials. In 1921, he entered politics and was elected to the Legislative Assembly of the United Provinces of Agra and Oudh.

In the freedom struggle
Known as an extremely capable lawyer, Pant was appointed by the Congress party to initially represent Ramprasad Bismill, Ashfaqulla Khan and other revolutionaries involved in the Kakori case in the mid 1920s. He participated in the protests against Simon Commission in 1928. Jawaharlal Nehru, in his autobiography, mentions how Pant stood by him during the protests and his large figure made him an easy target for the police. In those protests he sustained severe injuries which prevented him from straightening his back for the rest of his life.

In 1930, he was arrested and imprisoned for several weeks for organising a Salt March inspired by Gandhi's earlier actions. In 1933, he was arrested along with Harsh Dev Bahuguna (Gandhi of Choukot) and imprisoned for seven months for attending a session of the then-banned provincial Congress. In 1935, the ban was rescinded, and Pant joined the new Legislative Council. During the Second World War, Pant acted as the tiebreaker between Gandhi's faction, which advocated supporting the British Crown in their war effort, and Subhas Chandra Bose's faction, which advocated taking advantage of the situation to expel the British Raj by all means necessary.
In 1934, the Congress ended its boycott of the legislatures and put up candidates, and Pant was elected to the Central Legislative Assembly. He became deputy leader of the Congress party in the Assembly.

In 1940, Pant was arrested and imprisoned for helping organise the Satyagraha movement. In 1942 he was arrested again, this time for signing the Quit India resolution, and spent three years in Ahmednagar Fort along with other members of the Congress working committee until March 1945, at which point Jawaharlal Nehru pleaded successfully for Pant's release, on grounds of failing health.

Chief Minister of Uttar Pradesh
Pant took over as the Chief Minister of the United Provinces from 1937 to 1939.

In 1945, the British Labour government ordered new elections to the Provincial legislatures. The Congress won a majority in the 1946 elections in the United Provinces and Pant was again the Premier, continuing even after India's independence in 1947 till 1954.
 
His judicious reforms and stable governance in the Uttar Pradesh stabilised the economic condition of the most populous State of India.

Union Home Minister of India

Pant served as Union Home Minister from 1955 to 1961.
Pant was appointed Minister of Home Affairs in the Union Cabinet on 10 January 1955 in New Delhi by Jawaharlal Nehru. As Home Minister, his chief achievement was the re-organisation of States along linguistic lines. He was also responsible for the establishment of Hindi as an official language of the central government and a few states.

During his tenure as the Home Minister, Pant was awarded the Bharat Ratna on 26 January 1957.

Death

In 1960, he suffered a heart attack.  He was treated by top doctors in India, including his friend Dr Bidhan Chandra Roy, the then Chief Minister of West Bengal. His health started deteriorating and he died on 7 March 1961 at the age of 73, from a cerebral stroke. At that time he was still in office as the Home Minister of India.

Mourning him, Dr Rajendra Prasad, the then President of India was quoted as saying,"I had known Pandit Govind Ballabh Pant since 1922 and in this long period of association it had been my privilege to receive from him not only consideration but also affection. This is no time to assess his labour and his achievements. The grief is too intense for words. I can only pray for peace to his soul and strength to those who loved and admired him".

Institutions and monuments 

Govind Ballabh Pant Social Science Institute, Allahabad
Govind Ballabh Pant University of Agriculture and Technology, Pantnagar
Govind Ballabh Pant Engineering College, Pauri Garhwal, Uttarakhand
Govind Ballabh Pant Engineering College, Delhi
Govind Ballabh Pant Sagar is an Artificial lake at Sonebhadra, Uttar Pradesh

Family
Govind Ballabh Pant's son, Krishna Chandra Pant, was also a politician.

See also
K. C. Pant
Ila Pant
 First Govind Ballabh Pant ministry
 Second Govind Ballabh Pant ministry
 Third Govind Ballabh Pant ministry
 Fourth Govind Ballabh Pant ministry

References

Further reading 
 
 18 volumes on the Selected Works of Govind Ballabh Pant authored by Dr. B. R. Nanda

External links

 Read the complete biography of Pandit Govind Ballabh Pant, why he married trice?

View Profile/Photos and Videos of Govind Ballabh Pant
Govind Ballabh Pant Memorial Site

1887 births
1961 deaths
Indian independence activists from Uttar Pradesh
Prisoners and detainees of British India
Recipients of the Bharat Ratna
University of Allahabad alumni
Chief Ministers of Uttar Pradesh
Members of the Central Legislative Assembly of India
People from Kashipur, Uttarakhand
People from Almora district
Members of the Constituent Assembly of India
Ministers of Internal Affairs of India
Chief ministers from Indian National Congress
Rajya Sabha members from Uttar Pradesh
Gandhians
Indian National Congress politicians from Uttar Pradesh